Frea zambesiana is a species of beetle in the family Cerambycidae. It was described by E. Hintz in 1912. It is known from Malawi.

References

Further reading

 

zambesiana
Beetles described in 1912